The Santa Apolónia Station is the oldest railway terminus in Portugal. Situated in the civil parish of São Vicente, in the central part of the municipality of Lisbon, on the northern margin of the Tagus River in the historical district of Alfama.

History

In December 1844, under the initiative of José Bernardo da Costa Cabral, the Companhia das Obras Públicas was founded, with the purpose of constructing a rail line between Lisbon and Spain, in addition to intermodal station between rail and maritime services. The station was known as the Cais da América or Cais da Europa, and allowed rail passengers from Europe to offload to ships for America.

The initial project was for the construction at the Cais dos Soldados (Soldiers Wharf). Meanwhile, in December 1852, the engineer Thomaz Rumball proposed two alternatives, alongside the Museu Militar de Lisboa (Military Museum of Lisbon), or in the proximity of the Largo do Intendente. Another engineer, Harcourt White, also rejected the option of Cais dos Soldades on January 1853, because the location was too small to construct a station. He suggested that the station be situated along the river, after the Church of Anjos in Xabregas, where at the time there was free space. An executive committee was nominated to plan the construction of the Lisbon station, proposing the construction of a building along Rocha do Conde de Óbidos, with the capacity to receive passengers and commerce, with one of the lines continuing to area around the customs house in Terreiro do Paço. The construction project to Spain, therefore, began this year, under orders of Fontes Pereira de Melo,

The actual project to construct the station at Cais dos Soldados was approved by the government on 8 March 1854. The plan presented a station that included distinctive elements for commercial and passenger traffic, repair workshops, warehouses and services. For the passenger terminal, the government acquired the old Convent of Santa Apolónia, but the former army arsenal in the location was demolished to make way for the final design. From the beginning, the rail line and the commercial wharf required that land be reclaimed along the Tagus River.

At the inauguration of the first link of the Caminho de Ferro do Leste (Eastern line), between Carregado and Lisboa, on 28 September 1856, the construction of the station had not already begun. In the meantime, the terminal was installed in the provisionary building along the Palácio de Coimbra (Palace of Coimbra).

The project was designed by Angel Arribas Ugarte, and directed by director João Evangelista de Abreu, and his chief engineer Lecrenier, and constructed by the company Oppermann. The station was inaugurated on 1 May 1865, with the first line to the station beginning operation in 1873, to connect Santa Apolónia to Santos.

Between 1891 and 1957 most passenger services at Santa Apolónia moved to Rossio Train Station, then referred to as the Central Station.

From the 20th century, the national rail service Comboios de Portugal has operated different suburban, national and international routes (including links to Paris and Madrid, including the high-speed Alfa Pendular service. Santa Apolónia rail station is connected to the Lisbon Metro station of the same name, which opened in 2007.

Architecture

The station is situated along the northern margin of the Tagus River, in the Alfama district of Lisbon, integrated into the urban zone, along the Rua Caminhos de Ferro. Fronted by Rua Texeira Lopes, the three-register "U"-shaped building includes a short facade and long parallel wings extending around the rail platforms.

The principal symmetrical facade consists of a three-register Neoclassical, divided into five unequal veins. The first floor is dominated by five large rounded doorways, in addition to a lateral doorways on opposite ends of the facade, with rounded windows interspersed between the porticos. On the second floor are rounded windows, with the central and lateral windows much larger and with lintels. On the final floor includes a triangular pediment dominated by a clock. Similarly, the central and lateral vains include rounded windows, interlaced by square windows.

Services

References

Notes

Sources
 
 
 
 

Railway stations opened in 1856
Railway stations opened in 1865
Railway stations in Lisbon
1856 establishments in Portugal
1865 establishments in Portugal